Maruping Matthews Lekwene is a South African politician serving as the Northern Cape MEC for Health since June 2020. He has been a Member of the Northern Cape Provincial Legislature for the African National Congress (ANC) since June 2014. He was the Northern Cape MEC for Finance, Economic Development and Tourism from May 2019 until June 2020. Lekwene is also the provincial chairperson of the South African Communist Party (SACP) and the ANC's deputy provincial secretary.

Criticism
In December 2019, Lekwene announced that the trading hours of liquor stores in the Sol Plaatje Local Municipality would be extended during the ANC's 108th birthday celebrations from 8 to 11 January 2020. Under this notice, licensed liquor stores could trade for 24-hours during the period of the extension. The African National Congress Women's League (ANCWL) criticised this notice and called for it to be revoked. Lekwene later reversed the decision.

References

External links
 Maruping Matthews Lekwene – People's Assembly
 Mr Maruping Matthews Lekwene – Northern Cape Provincial Legislature (NCPL)

|-

Living people
African National Congress politicians
South African Communist Party politicians
People from the Northern Cape
Members of the Northern Cape Provincial Legislature
South African politicians
Year of birth missing (living people)